This article concerns the period 399 BC – 390 BC.

References